Cerro de la Estrella (English: Star Hill) may refer to:
 Cerro de la Estrella, Mexico City a 2,613 m high mountain in Mexico City
 Cerro de la Estrella (archeological site) 
 Cerro de la Estrella National Park
 Cerro de la Estrella, Sierra Morena, a 1,298 m high mountain in Sierra Morena, Spain
 Metro Cerro de la Estrella, a metro station in Mexico City